Attupurathu Mathew Abraham (11 June 1924 – 1 December 2002), pen name Abu, was an Indian cartoonist, journalist, and author. In a career spanning 40 years, Abu Abraham worked for various national and international newspapers including The Bombay Chronicle, Shankar's Weekly, Blitz, Tribune, The Observer (1956–1966), The Guardian (1966–1969), and The Indian Express (1969–1981).

He was a lifelong atheist and rationalist.

Early years

Born in Mavelikara, Kerala as the son of A.M. Mathew and Kantamma, Abu started drawing cartoons at the age of 3. After studying French, Mathematics, and English at University College, Thiruvananthapuram (Trivandrum) and being the tennis champion, he graduated in 1945.

Work in London
In 1953, he met Fred Joss of the London Star, who encouraged him to move to London. At 32, Abu arrived in London in the summer of 1953 and immediately sold cartoons to Punch magazine and the Daily Sketch and started to contribute material to Everybodys' London Opinion and Eastern World using the pen name 'Abraham'. In 1956, after two cartoons were published in Tribune, he was sent a personal letter by David Astor, the editor of The Observer, the world's oldest Sunday newspaper, offering him a permanent job as its first ever political cartoonist. Astor asked Abu to change his pen name as 'Abraham' would imply a false slant on his cartoons, and so he settled on 'Abu', a schoolboy nickname of his.

He was described in The Guardian as "the conscience of the Left and the pea under the princess's mattress". He also produced reportage drawings from around the world.  In 1962 in Cuba he drew Che Guevara and spent three hours in a nightclub with Fidel Castro.

Return to India
He returned to India with his first wife (Sarojini, from Tamil Nadu, who he later divorced) and two daughters, Aysha and Janaki, in 1969 to work as the political cartoonist on the Indian Express until 1981.  In 1970 he was given a special award by the British Film Institute for a short film based on Noah's Ark called No Arks. From 1972 until 1978, he was nominated a member of the Rajya Sabha, the upper house of the Indian Parliament.

In 1975 Indian Emergency was declared and the freedom of the press was suspended, and Abu fell out of favour with Indira Gandhi. The direct result of this was the publication of the book Games of the Emergency in 1977, which contained the political articles and cartoons that he could not print during the Emergency. As well as illustrating other books, other collections of his cartoons were Abu on Bangladesh (1972), Private View (1974), and Arrivals and Departures (1983).  He also edited the Penguin Book of Indian Cartoons (1988).

The hallmark of Abu Abraham's cartoons was their merciless attack upon the corruption in politics. As a mark of the man, his cartoons were an assortment of simple lines that stood out for their directness of expression augmented by arresting punch lines that never missed the mark.

From 1981, Abu worked as a freelancer, syndicating his work to several newspapers and commencing a new strip cartoon, Salt and Pepper. The crow and the elephant in this philosophical strip begin to take over from the political cartoons, according to his daughter Ayisha Abraham. In 1988 Abu moved back to Kerala. He died on 1 December 2002 and was survived by his British-born wife Psyche.  His death was marked by a two-minute silence in the Rajya Sabha and he was cremated with full state honours.

References

External links

 Abu Abraham bibliography at WorldCat
No Arks, animation film written by Abu Abraham
Abu Abraham's cartoons at the British Cartoon Archive
Frontline Archives
Report from Spectrum, The Tribune dated 2 November 2003.
Rediff.com article
Homage from Indian Institute of Cartoonists 

Indian atheists
Indian cartoonists
Indian editorial cartoonists
Malayali people
Writers from Kerala
1924 births
2002 deaths
University College Thiruvananthapuram alumni
People from Alappuzha district
Nominated members of the Rajya Sabha